Alphonse Allais (20 October 1854 – 28 October 1905) was a French writer, journalist and humorist.

Life

Allais was born in Honfleur, Calvados. He died in Paris.

Work
He is the author of many collections of whimsical writings. A poet as much as a humorist, he cultivated the verse form known as holorhyme (all verses are homophonous, where entire lines are pronounced the same). For example:

Par les bois du djinn où s'entasse de l'effroi,
Parle et bois du gin, ou cent tasses de lait froid.

Allais wrote the earliest known example of a completely silent musical composition. His Funeral March for the Obsequies of a Great Deaf Man of 1897 consists of 24 blank measures. It predates similarly silent but intellectually serious works by John Cage and Erwin Schulhoff by many years. His prose piece "Story for Sara" was translated and illustrated by Edward Gorey.

Allais participated in humorous exhibitions, including those of the Salon des Arts Incohérents of 1883 and 1884, held at the Galerie Vivienne. At these, inspired by his friend Paul Bilhaud's 1882 exhibit of an entirely black painting entitled "Negroes fight in a tunnel" (which he later reproduced with a slightly different title), Allais exhibited arguably some of the earliest examples of monochrome painting: for instance his plain white sheet of Bristol paper  (First Communion of Anemic Young Girls In The Snow) (1883), and a similar red work Apoplectic Cardinals Harvesting Tomatoes on the Shore of the Red Sea (Aurora Borealis Effect) (1884). Allais published his Album primo-avrilesque in 1897, a monograph with seven monochrome artworks, accompanied by the score of his silent funeral march.  (Bilhaud was not the first to create an all-black artwork: for example, Robert Fludd published an image of "Darkness" in his 1617 book on the origin and structure of the cosmos; and Bertall published his black Vue de La Hogue (effet de nuit) in 1843.) However, Allais's activity bears more similarity to 20th century Dada, or Neo-Dada, and particularly the works of the Fluxus group of the 1960s, than to 20th century monochrome painting since Malevich.

While consuming absinthe at café tables, Allais wrote 1600 newspaper and magazine pieces, and co-founded the Club of the Hydropaths (those allergic to water). He was a journalist, columnist and editor as well.

A film based on his novel L'Affaire Blaireau appeared in 1958 as Neither Seen Nor Recognized . Earlier versions with the same title as the original novel appeared in 1923 and 1932.

Miles Kington, humorous writer and musician, translated some of Allais' pieces into idiomatic English as The World of Alphonse Allais (UK). In the United States, Doug Skinner has translated thirteen books by Allais, including Captain Cap and his only novel.

Honfleur has a street, rue Alphonse Allais, and a school, Collège Alphonse Allais, named for him. There is a Place Alphonse-Allais in the 20th arrondissement of Paris. The Académie Alphonse-Allais has awarded an annual prize, the Prix Alphonse-Allais, in his honor since 1954.

Discovery 

In 2018, the French expert Johann Naldi, a specialist in nineteenth-century art, discovered among a previously unpublished set of seventeen works of Incoherents "Des souteneurs encore dans la force de l'âge et le ventre dans l'herbe boivent de l'absinthe", consisting of a green carriage curtain embellished with a cartel with a title. Executed before 1897, when Allais was compiling his monochroidal experiments in his Album primo-avrilesque, this work is the only monochrome by Alphonse Allais identified to date, classified as a National Treasure on May 7, 2021 by decision of the Ministry of Culture.

Museum

The Alphonse Allais Museum, also called Le Petit Musée, in Honfleur, claiming to be the smallest museum in France (8 m2), consists of a small collection of "rarities", including the skull of Voltaire at age seventeen and a true piece of a False Cross (cf. True Cross), as well as inventions such as a special Chinese teacup made for left-handed people (cf. chawan), blue, white, and red starch to keep flags flying when there is no wind, black confetti for widows, and so on. The museum was founded on the second floor in Allais' parents' pharmacy in 1999 by the owner of the pharmacy, and moved to a new location in 2019 (rue des Petites boucheries).

Organizations

Two non-profit organizations celebrate Allais:
 The Association des Amis d'Alphonse Allais (AAAA), founded in 1934, manages the Allais Museum and promotes young humorists who follow in the spirit of Allais.
 The Académie Alphonse Allais, created in 1954, Allais' 100th birthday, by Henri Jeanson, like the Académie française, names new members annually and sponsors the "Alphonse Allais" literary prize.

Principal works

, 1891
, 1892
, 1895
, 1898
L'Affaire Blaireau (The Blaireau Case), 1899
 (literally Let's not hit each other), 1900

English translations
Published in the US
Let's Not Hit Each Other. Translated by Doug Skinner (Black Scat Books, 2023)
Loves, Delights, & Organs. Translated by Doug Skinner (Black Scat Books, 2022)
2 + 2 = 5. Translated by Doug Skinner (Black Scat Books, 2021)
Pink and Apple-Green. Translated by Doug Skinner (Black Scat Books, 2020)
The Alphonse Allais Reader. Compiled and translated by Doug Skinner (Black Scat Books, 2018)
No Bile!. Translated by Doug Skinner (Black Scat Books, 2018)
Masks. Translated & illustrated by Norman Conquest (Absurdist Texts & Documents #1), 2018)
Long Live Life!. Translated by Doug Skinner (Black Scat Books, 2017)
I Am Sarcey. Translated by Doug Skinner (Black Scat Books, 2017)
Double Over. Translated by Doug Skinner (Black Scat Books, 2016)
The Blaireau Affair. Translated by Doug Skinner (Black Scat Books, 2015)
The Squadron's Umbrella. Translated by Doug Skinner (Black Scat Books, 2015)
Selected Plays of Alphonse Allais. Translated by Doug Skinner (Black Scat Books, 2014)
Captain Cap: His Adventures, His Ideas, His Drinks. Translated by Doug Skinner (Black Scat Books, 2013)
Captain Cap: Vol. I. Translated by Doug Skinner (Black Scat Books: Absurdist Texts & Documents Series No. 11, 2013)
Captain Cap: Vol. II: The Apparent Symbiosis Between the Boa and Giraffe. Translated by Doug Skinner (Black Scat Books: Absurdist Texts & Documents Series No. 14, 2013)
Captain Cap: Vol. III: The Antifilter & Other Inventions. Translated by Doug Skinner (Black Scat Books: Absurdist Texts & Documents Series No. 17, 2013)
Captain Cap: Vol. IV: The Sanatorium of the Future. Translated by Doug Skinner (Black Scat Books: Absurdist Texts & Documents Series No. 20, 2013)
How I Became an Idiot by Francisque Sarcey (Alphonse Allais). Translated by Doug Skinner (Black Scat Books: Absurdist Texts & Documents - Interim Edition No. 00, 2013)
The Adventures of Captain Cap. Translated by Brian Stableford (Black Coat Press, 2013)

Notes

References

External links

 Association des Amis d'Alphonse Allais
 Académie Alphonse Allais
 
 
 

1854 births
1905 deaths
People from Honfleur
Writers from Normandy
19th-century French poets
French humorists
Minimalist composers
French male poets
19th-century French male writers